Pauli Samuel Opas (s. 30 October 1929 Kurikka) is a Finnish diplomat and Ambassador. He is a Bachelor of Political Science degree. He served as Head of the Department for Trade Policy at the Ministry for Foreign Affairs 1979–1984 and Ambassador Tokyo 1984–1985 ja Prague 1993–1994

References 

Ambassadors of Finland to Japan
Ambassadors of Finland to the Czech Republic